Jääskeläinen is a Finnish surname. Notable people with the surname include:

Ilkka Jääskeläinen, Finnish musician
Jari Jääskeläinen, Finnish ice hockey player
Jarmo Jääskeläinen (1937-2022), Finnish journalist and documentary maker
Jussi Jääskeläinen, Finnish footballer goalkeeper
Oula Jääskeläinen, Finnish figure skater
Pietari Jääskeläinen, Finnish politician
Sulo Jääskeläinen, Finnish skier
Yrjö Jääskeläinen (Yrjö Tapani Jääskeläinen) (born 1956), Finnish wheelchair curler, 2018 Winter Paralympian

Originally a Savonian surname, the name literally means "of/from Jääski" and was originally given to people who moved from Jääski to Savonia.

References

Finnish-language surnames